Pugh Ford Bridge, also known as Bartholomew County Bridge No. 73, is a historic Pratt through truss bridge spanning the Flatrock River at Flat Rock Township and German Township, Bartholomew County, Indiana. It was built by the Elkhart Bridge and Iron Co. and built in 1911.  It consists of two spans, with each measuring 128 feet long. It rests on concrete abutments and a concrete pier.

It was listed on the National Register of Historic Places in 1999.

References

Road bridges on the National Register of Historic Places in Indiana
Bridges completed in 1911
Transportation buildings and structures in Bartholomew County, Indiana
National Register of Historic Places in Bartholomew County, Indiana
1911 establishments in Indiana
Pratt truss bridges in the United States
Metal bridges in the United States